The common eland (Taurotragus oryx), also known as the southern eland or eland antelope, is a large-sized savannah and plains antelope found in East and Southern Africa. It is a species of the family Bovidae and genus Taurotragus. It is the second-largest antelope in the world, being slightly smaller on average than the giant eland. It was scientifically described by Peter Simon Pallas in 1766.

Mainly a herbivore, its diet is primarily grasses and leaves. Common elands form herds of up to 500 animals, but are not territorial. The common eland prefers habitats with a wide variety of flowering plants such as savannah, woodlands, and open and montane grasslands; it avoids dense forests. It uses loud barks, visual and postural movements, and the flehmen response to communicate and warn others of danger. The common eland is used by humans for leather, meat, and milk, and has been domesticated in many areas. Eland milk contains more butterfat than cow's milk, and can keep longer without pasteurising.

It is native to Angola, Botswana, the Democratic Republic of the Congo, Eswatini, Ethiopia, Kenya, Lesotho, Malawi, Mozambique, Namibia, Rwanda, South Africa, South Sudan, Tanzania, Uganda, Zambia, and Zimbabwe, but is no longer present in Burundi. While the common eland's population is decreasing, it is classified as of least concern by the International Union for Conservation of Nature.

Etymology
The scientific name of the common eland is Taurotragus oryx, composed of three words: tauros, tragos, and oryx. Tauros is Greek for a bull or bullock, meaning the same as the Latin taurus. Tragos is Greek for a male goat, referring to the tuft of hair that grows in the eland's ear and its resemblance to a goat's beard. Oryx is Latin and Greek (genitive: orygos) for pickaxe, referring to the pointed horns of North African antelopes like the common eland and scimitar-horned oryx.

The name "eland" is Dutch for "elk" or "moose". It has a Baltic source similar to the Lithuanian élnis, which means "deer". It was borrowed earlier as ellan (French) in the 1610s or Elend (German). When Dutch settlers came to the Cape of Good Hope, creating the Dutch Cape Colony, they named the animal after the large, herbivorous moose. In Dutch, the animal is called "eland antelope" to distinguish it from the moose, which is found in the northern boreal forests.

Physical description

Common elands are spiral-horned antelopes. They are sexually dimorphic, with females being smaller than the males. Females weigh , measure  from the snout to the base of the tail and stand  at the shoulder.

Their coat differs geographically, with elands in northern part of their range having distinctive markings (torso stripes, markings on legs, dark garters and a spinal crest) that are absent in the south. Apart from a rough mane, the coat is smooth. Females have a tan coat, while the coats of males are darker, with a bluish-grey tinge. Bulls may also have a series of vertical white stripes on their sides (mainly in parts of the Karoo in South Africa). As males age, their coat becomes more grey. Males also have dense fur on their foreheads and a large dewlap on their throats.

Both sexes have horns with a steady spiral ridge (resembling that of the bushbuck). The horns are visible as small buds in newborns and grow rapidly during the first seven months. Males use their horns during rutting season to wrestle and butt heads with rivals, while females use their horns to protect their young from predators.

The common eland is the slowest antelope, with a peak speed of  that tires them quickly. However, they can maintain a  trot indefinitely. The common eland's life expectancy is generally between 15 and 20 years; in captivity, some live up to 25 years.

Eland herds are accompanied by a loud clicking sound that has been subject to considerable speculation. The weight of the animal may cause the two halves of its hooves to splay apart, and the clicking is the result of the hoof snapping together when the animal raises its leg. The sound carries some distance from a herd, and may be a form of communication.

Taxonomy

The common eland was first described in 1766 by German zoologist and botanist Peter Simon Pallas. It belongs to the order Artiodactyla, family Bovidae, and subfamily Bovinae. Common elands are sometimes considered part of the genus Tragelaphus on the basis of molecular phylogenetics, but are usually categorized as Taurotragus, along with the giant eland (T. derbianus).

Subspecies
Three subspecies of common elands have been recognized, though their validity has been disputed.

 T. o. oryx (Pallas, 1766; Cape eland): also called alces, barbatus, canna and oreas. It is found in Southern and southwestern Africa. The fur is tawny and adults lose their stripes.
 T. o. livingstonii (Sclater, 1864; Livingstone's eland): also called kaufmanni, niediecki, selousi and triangularis. It is found in the Central Zambezian miombo woodlands. Livingstone's eland has brown fur with up to 12 stripes.
 T. o. pattersonianus (Lydekker, 1906; East African eland or Patterson's eland): also called billingae. It is found in East Africa, hence its common name. Like Livingstone's eland, its fur can also have up to 12 stripes.

Genetics and evolution
Male elands have 31 diploid chromosomes and females have 32. The male (Y) chromosome has been translocated to the short arm of an autosome. Both the X chromosome and Y chromosome replicate late; they do not match well and are variable. The chromosomes resemble those of the greater kudu (Tragelaphus strepsiceros).

Male elands and female greater kudus can produce a viable male hybrid, though whether it is sterile is unknown. An accidental crossing of an East African common eland (T. o. pattersonianus''') with an East African kudu (T. s. bea) occurred in the San Diego Zoo Safari Park. This was believed to be due to the absence of male kudus in the herd. The hybrid produced was sterile, which was unexpected before the study. The study confirmed the chromosome numbers of both the eland and the kudu and the strangeness of their attached Y chromosomes. Reports state that repeated matings of male elands with domestic (Bos primigenius) and zebu cows (Bos indicus) have also produced sterile hybrids. Female elands can also act as surrogates for bongos.

The Bovidae family ancestors of the common eland evolved approximately 20 million years ago in Africa; fossils are found throughout Africa and France, but the best record appears in sub-Saharan Africa. The first members of the tribe Tragelaphini appear six million years in the past during the late Miocene. An extinct ancestor of the common eland (Taurotragus arkelli) appears in the Pleistocene in northern Tanzania and the first T. oryx fossil appears in the Holocene in Algeria.

In 2010, a genetic study was made basing on the evolutionary history of common elands. Located in the sub-Saharan savanna biome of East and Southern Africa, the study used methods including analysis of mitochondrial DNA control-region fragments from 122 individuals to learn more about various topics, such as the phylogeography, genetic diversity, and demographic history of the species. The conclusions strongly supported the presence of a longer-standing population in the south and a mosaic of Pleistocene refugia in the east. Today, their extinction from these parts is thought to be due to colonization. The similarity of dates obtained from more studies indicates a significant event around 200 ka, which had brought a great change in the genetic history of the species.

Habitat and distribution

Common elands live on the open plains of Southern Africa and along the foothills of the great southern African plateau. The species extends north into Ethiopia and most arid zones of South Sudan, west into eastern Angola and Namibia, and south to South Africa. However, a low density of elands exists in Africa due to poaching and human settlement.

Elands do, however, avoid forests, swamps and deserts. The places inhabited by elands generally contain Acacia, Combretum, Commiphora, Diospyros, Grewia, Rhus, and Ziziphus trees and shrubs; some of these also serve as their food.

Eland can be found in many national parks and reserves today, including Nairobi National Park and Tsavo East National Park, Tsavo West National Park, Masai Mara National Reserve, (Kenya); Serengeti National Park, Ruaha National Park and Tarangire National Park, Ngorongoro Crater, (Tanzania); Kagera National Park (Rwanda); Nyika National Park (Malawi); Lake Mburo National Park (Uganda); Kidepo Valley National Park (Uganda); Luangwa Valley and Kafue National Park (Zambia); Hwange National Park, Matobo National Park, Tuli Safari Area and Chimanimani Eland Sanctuary (Zimbabwe); Kruger National Park, Kgalagadi Transfrontier Park, Giant's Castle and Suikerbosrand NR (South Africa).

They live on home ranges that can be 200–400 km2 for females and juveniles and 50 km2 for males.

Ecology and behavior

Common elands are nomadic and crepuscular. They eat in the morning and evening, rest in shade when hot, and remain in sunlight when cold. They are commonly found in herds numbering up to 500, with individual members remaining in the herd from several hours to several months. Juveniles and mothers tend to form larger herds, while males may separate into smaller groups or wander individually. During estrus, mainly in the rainy season, groups tend to form more regularly. In Southern Africa, common elands will often associate with herds of zebras, roan antelopes and oryxes.

Common elands communicate via gestures, vocalizations, scent cues, and display behaviors. The flehmen response also occurs, primarily in males in response to contact with female urine or genitals. Females urinate to indicate fertility during the appropriate phase of their estrous cycle, as well as to indicate their lack of fertility when harassed by males. If eland bulls find any of their predators nearby, they bark and attempt to attract the attention of others by trotting back and forth until the entire herd is conscious of the danger. Some of their main predators include lions, African wild dogs, cheetahs, and spotted hyenas. Juvenile elands are more vulnerable than adults to their predators.

Diet 

Common elands are herbivores that browse during drier winter, but have also adapted to grazing during the rainy season when grasses are more common and nutritious. They require a high-protein diet of succulent leaves from flowering plants, but will consume lower-quality plant material if available, including forbs, trees, shrubs, grasses, seeds, and tubers. Grasses that elands eat include Setaria and Themeda and fruits from Securinega and Strychnos. Large antelope can survive on lower-quality food in times of little rain. 

Most of their water is obtained from their food, though they drink water when available. As they quickly adjust to the surroundings due to seasonal changes and other causes, they change their feeding habits. They also use their horns to break off branches that are hard to reach.

 Thermoregulation 
Common elands have several thermoregulatory adaptations to help them withstand the extreme temperatures of their environments. Using peripheral thermal receptors on the skin, elands can sense heat and increase or decrease evaporative cooling accordingly. On sunnier days, common elands maintain a cooler skin temperature relative to their inner body temperature. Elands achieve cooler skin temperatures by increasing cutaneous evaporation. This allows them to feel cooler, even though their internal body temperature stays relatively the same throughout the day. The eland can also conserve water by increasing its body temperature. When temperatures rise above a certain threshold, an increase in sweating and panting is also observed. Common elands use their sparse fur coats to dissipate excess heat via reradiation. The dewlap is also believed to play a role in thermoregulation. Due to its high surface area to volume ratio, it may allow for efficient thermoregulation in larger common elands with larger dewlaps.

Sociability and reproduction

Females are sexually mature at 15 to 36 months and males at 4 to 5 years. Mating may occur anytime after reaching sexual maturity, but is mostly seen in the rainy season. In Zambia, young are born in July and August, while elsewhere this is the mating season. Mating begins when elands gather to feed on lush, green plains with plentiful grass, and some males and females start mating with each other in separate pairs. Males chase the females to find out if they are in estrus. They also test the female's urine. Usually, a female chooses the most dominant and fit male to mate with. Sometimes, she runs away from males trying to mate, causing more attraction. This results in fights between males, in which their hard horns are used. A female allows a male to mount after two to four hours. Males usually keep close contact with females in the mating period. The dominant male can mate with more than one female. Females have a gestation period of nine months, and give birth to only one calf each time.

Males, females, and juveniles each form separate social groups. The male groups are the smallest; the members stay together and search for food or water sources. The female group is much larger and covers greater areas. They travel the grassy plains in wet periods and prefer bushy areas in dry periods. Females have a complex linear hierarchy. The nursery and juvenile group is naturally formed when females give birth to calves. After about 24 hours of the delivery, the mother and calf join this group. The calves start befriending each other and stay back in the nursery group, while the mother returns to the female group. The calves leave the nursery group when they are at least two years old and join a male or female group.

Diseases and parasites
Common elands are resistant to trypanosomiasis, a protozoan infection that has the tsetse fly as a vector, but not to the Rhipicephalus-transmitted disease theileriosis. The disease-causing bacterium Theileria taurotragi has caused many eland deaths. Clostridium chauvoei, another bacterium, can be harmful, as well. Elands are also hosts to several kinds of ticks. In one study, an eland was found to be host to the Amblyomma species A. gemma and A. variegatum, and Rhipicephalus species R. decoloratus, R. appendiculatus, R. evertsi, R. pulchellus and R. pravus. Elands produce antibodies for Brucella bacteria, but none for Mycobacterium paratuberculosis'' or various types of pneumonia like contagious bovine pneumonia and contagious caprine pneumonia, normally infectious in cows or antelopes.

Interaction with humans

Conservation

Currently, common elands are not endangered. They are conserved by the United States Endangered Species Act, and regulated in international trade by the Convention on International Trade in Endangered Species. Using ground counts and aerial surveys, the International Union for Conservation of Nature (IUCN) calculates the population density of the common eland to be between 0.05 and 1 per square kilometre with a total population estimate of 136,000. Populations are considered stable or increasing in the countries of Namibia, Botswana, Zimbabwe, South Africa, Malawi, Kenya and Tanzania.

The population is, however, gradually decreasing due to habitat loss, caused by expanding human settlements and poaching for its superior meat. As they are docile and inactive most of the time, they can easily be killed. The species became extinct in Eswatini and Zimbabwe, but has been reintroduced.

The IUCN states that about half of the estimated total population lives in protected areas and 30% on private land. Protected areas that support major populations include Omo (Ethiopia), Serengeti, Katavi, Ruaha, and Selous-Kilombero (Tanzania), Kafue and North Luangwa (Zambia), Nyika (Malawi), Etosha (Namibia), Kgalagadi Transfrontier Park (Botswana/South Africa) and Ukhahlamba Drakensberg Park (South Africa). Most of these populations appear to be stable. Relatively large numbers of common elands now live on private land, particularly in Namibia, Zimbabwe, and South Africa, reflecting its value as a trophy animal. Common elands have also been widely domesticated in Zimbabwe, South Africa, and Kenya, as well as in Russia and Ukraine.

Uses

The common eland is sometimes farmed and hunted for its meat, and in some cases can be better used than cattle because it is more suited to African climates. This has led to some Southern African farmers switching from cattle to eland. Common elands are also pictured as supporters in the coat of arms of Grootfontein, Namibia.

Husbandry
Common elands have a mild temperament and have been successfully domesticated for meat and milk production in South Africa and Russia. Their need for water is quite low because they produce urine with a highurea content, but they require a substantial grazing area, along with salt licks and large amounts of supplementary feed such as maize, sorghum, melons, and beans, which can be expensive. The pleasant-tasting milk has a butterfat content of 11-17% and can be stored for up to eight months if properly prepared, versus several days for cow milk.

Sometimes, wild elands break through enclosures to mix with domesticated ones. Common elands can reproduce in captivity, but calf survival is low and the young may need to be separated from their mothers to ensure health and adequate feeding. Husbandry requires care because the generally placid animals startle easily and require large amounts of space.

References

External links

 Information at ITIS
 
 

common eland
Fauna of East Africa
Mammals of Southern Africa
Mammals of Burundi
Mammals of Botswana
Mammals of Angola
Mammals of Ethiopia
Mammals of Kenya
Mammals of Lesotho
Mammals of Malawi
Mammals of Mozambique
Mammals of Namibia
Mammals of Rwanda
Mammals of South Africa
Mammals of South Sudan
Mammals of Eswatini
Mammals of Tanzania
Mammals of the Democratic Republic of the Congo
Mammals of Uganda
Mammals of Zambia
Mammals of Zimbabwe
Animals in mythology
common eland
Taxa named by Peter Simon Pallas
Bovids of Africa